The Queen Elizabeth Hospital in Kota Kinabalu, Sabah is the main hospital for the city and the whole of Sabah as well as the alternate feeder general hospital for the neighbouring Federal Territory of Labuan (although they have a main one known as Hospital Labuan), but also accommodates patients from the neighbouring state of Sarawak as well as far as the neighbouring countries/regions of Brunei and also North Kalimantan, Indonesia (which makes both hospitals combined as one of the pan-Borneo general public hospitals), the other being the Sarawak General Hospital in Kuching, Sarawak.

It is named after Queen Elizabeth II of the United Kingdom, who was also the reigning sovereign of the colonial British Empire during its establishment in 1957.

History 
The first hospital building was built in 1957 (firstly in the Karamunsing neighbourhood of the city) along the Old Tuaran Road, known as Jalan Tuaran Lama (next to the former site premises of the Radio Televisyen Malaysia branch headquarters building, which has since been demolished and vacated since 2011 for future developments, in which that area was also known to be the current sites for the upcoming Radio Sabah broadcasting museum as well as the upcoming permanent branch office building premises of the Jabatan Audit Negara, the hospital only moved to its permanent existing site in Kepayan Ridge sixteen years later in 1973, ten years after the formation of Malaysia), then followed by a second building in 1981, this has since been demolished in 2009 and currently it is being replaced with a new one the same year, in which it is still in use until the present era. This reinforced concrete tower was found to be using unwashed sea sand as part of the concrete mix, which caused its structure to fail which leads into its demolition. The hospital was visited by the Queen in 1971.

Prior to the demolishment of existing first building in 2009, the federal government purchased the former building premises of the Sabah Medical Centre (SMC) private hospital located in the Damai neighbourhood (now known as the KPJ Sabah Specialist Hospital, in which they have a permanent building just across the street nearby to the current QEH 2 premises since 2014), whereby it was renovated and being renamed as Queen Elizabeth Hospital II. The second building has since been maintained until this date. Although the service for normal patients has been returned to the new first building located at the existing main hospital building premises in Kepayan Ridge, the second building that was located in Damai is mainly used now as a heart centre or a specialist hospital for cardiothoracic health-related services (but other health services are also provided in the second building as well).

See also 
 List of hospitals in Malaysia

References

External links 
 
  (QEH 1)
  (QEH 2)

Hospital buildings completed in 1957
Hospitals in Sabah
Buildings and structures in Kota Kinabalu
20th-century architecture in Malaysia